Neohouzeaua is a genus of Asian bamboo within the grass family).

These species have culms growing in large tufts, often somewhat scandent.

Neohouzeaua is sometimes included in the genus Schizostachyum.

Species
 Neohouzeaua fimbriata - Myanmar, Thailand
 Neohouzeaua helferi -  India straggling bamboo - Myanmar, Assam, Arunachal Pradesh, Bhutan
 Neohouzeaua kerriana - Thailand
 Neohouzeaua mekongensis - Laos, Cambodia, Vietnam
 Neohouzeaua stricta - straight-culmed Burma bamboo - Myanmar
 Neohouzeaua tavoyana - straight-culmed Burma bamboo - Myanmar

formerly included
see Dinochloa Schizostachyum 
 Neohouzeaua coradata - Schizostachyum coradatum 
 Neohouzeaua dulloa - Schizostachyum dullooa
 Neohouzeaua puberula - Dinochloa puberula

References

Bambusoideae
Bambusoideae genera